36th Reconnaissance Squadron may refer to:
 The 425th Bombardment Squadron, designated the 36th Reconnaissance Squadron (Heavy) in April 1942.  
The 36th Photographic Reconnaissance Squadron